Khuresh is a traditional Tuvan wrestling, in Siberia. The word has cognates with Tuvan's sister Turkic languages, for example Turkish güreş and Tatar köräş (all ultimately derived from Old Turkic keriş).

See also
Kurash
Wrestling in Turkey
Yağlı güreş
Mongolian wrestling
Sambo

References

Tuvan culture
Sport in Mongolia
Folk wrestling styles